Here are lists of schools which only admit boys in Hong Kong.

Hong Kong Island
 Central and Western District
Secondary Government
 King's College
Secondary Aided
 St Joseph's College
 St Louis School
Secondary Direct Subsidy Scheme
 St Paul's College
Primary Private
St. Louis School (Primary Section) (聖類斯中學（小學部）)

Eastern District
Secondary Aided
 Salesian English School (慈幼英文學校)
Primary Aided
 Pun U Association Wah Yan Primary School (番禺會所華仁小學)
 Salesian School (慈幼學校)

Southern District
Secondary Aided
  (香港仔工業學校)
  (香港航海學校)
Primary Direct Subsidy
 St Paul's College Primary School (聖保羅書院小學)
Special Aided
 HK Juvenile Care Centre Chan Nam Cheong Memorial School (香港青少年培育會陳南昌紀念學校)

Wan Chai District
Government Secondary
 Queen's College
Secondary Aided
  (香港鄧鏡波書院)
 Wah Yan College, Hong Kong
Primary Aided
 St Joseph's Primary School (聖若瑟小學)

Kowloon
Kowloon City District
Secondary Aided
 Chan Sui Ki (La Salle) College (陳瑞祺（喇沙）書院)
 La Salle College (喇沙書院)
 Tang King Po School (鄧鏡波學校)
Secondary Direct Subsidy
 Diocesan Boys' School (拔萃男書院)
Primary Aided
 La Salle Primary School (喇沙小學)
Primary Direct Subsidy
 Diocesan Boys' School (拔萃男書院)

Kwun Tong District
Secondary Government
 Kwun Tong Kung Lok Government Secondary School (觀塘功樂官立中學)
Secondary Aided
 Kwun Tong Maryknoll College (觀塘瑪利諾書院)
 Sing Yin Secondary School (聖言中學)
 St Joseph's Anglo-Chinese School (聖若瑟英文中學)
Primary Private
 St Joseph's Anglo-Chinese Primary School (聖若瑟英文小學)
Special Aided
 Society of Boys' Centres Shing Tak Centre School (香港扶幼會盛德中心學校)

Sham Shui Po District
Secondary Aided
 Cheung Sha Wan Catholic Secondary School (長沙灣天主教英文中學)
Secondary Direct Subsidy
 Ying Wa College (英華書院)
Primary Direct Subsidy
 Ying Wa Primary School (英華小學)
Special Aided
 The Society of Boys' Centres Hui Chung Sing Memorial School (香港扶幼會－許仲繩紀念學校)
 The Society of Boys' Centres Chak Yan Centre School (香港扶幼會則仁中心學校

Wong Tai Sin District
Secondary Aided
 Choi Hung Estate Catholic Secondary School (彩虹邨天主教英文中學)
 Ng Wah Catholic Secondary School (天主教伍華中學)

Yau Tsim Mong District
Secondary Aided
 St Francis Xavier's College (聖芳濟書院)
 Wah Yan College, Kowloon (華仁書院（九龍）)
Primary Aided
 Tak Sun School (德信學校)

New Territories
East
Sha Tin District
 Tak Sun Secondary School (德信中學) (Secondary Direct Subsidy)

West
Kwai Tsing District
  (天主教慈幼會伍少梅中學) (Secondary Aided)

Tsuen Wan District
  (荃灣聖芳濟中學) (Secondary Aided)

Tuen Mun District
 Tung Wan Mok Law Shui Wah School (東灣莫羅瑞華學校) (Special Aided)

Former
Became coeducational
 Lung Cheung Government Secondary Technical School (Secondary Government)

Closed
  (上葵涌官立中學) (Secondary Government)

See also
 List of girls' schools in Hong Kong

References

External links

Boys